Playing in the Band, Seattle, Washington, 5/21/74 is a live album by the rock band the Grateful Dead.  It was recorded on May 21, 1974 at Hec Edmundson Pavilion in Seattle.  It was released as a vinyl LP in a limited edition of 7,400 copies on November 23, 2018, as part of Record Store Day Black Friday.

The album contains only one song, "Playing in the Band".  At 46 minutes in length, it is the longest continuous Grateful Dead song ever recorded.  This recording was previously released earlier in 2018 as part of the albums Pacific Northwest '73–'74: The Complete Recordings and Pacific Northwest '73–'74: Believe It If You Need It.

Playing in the Band is the second Grateful Dead LP that contains only one song and that was produced for Record Store Day.  The first was Dark Star, which was recorded in 1972 and released in 2012.

Track listing 
Side A
"Playing in the Band" (Bob Weir, Mickey Hart, Robert Hunter) – 21:40
Side B
"Playing in the Band", continued (Weir, Hart, Hunter) – 24:44

Personnel 
Grateful Dead
Jerry Garcia – guitar, vocals
Donna Jean Godchaux – vocals
Keith Godchaux – keyboards
Bill Kreutzmann – drums
Phil Lesh – bass, vocals
Bob Weir – guitar, vocals
Production
Produced by Grateful Dead
Produced for release by David Lemieux
Mastering: Jeffrey Norman
Recording: Kidd Candelario
Tape restoration: Jamie Howarth, John Chester
Lacquers: Chris Bellman
Art direction, design: Lisa Glines

References 

Grateful Dead live albums
Rhino Records live albums
2018 live albums